Lewis Malone Ayer Jr. (November 21, 1821 – March 8, 1895) was a South Carolina politician who served as a Confederate Congressman during the American Civil War.

Ayer was born near Barnwell, South Carolina, and educated in the common schools. He attended law school and passed his bar exam. After establishing a successful practice, he served in the state legislature from 1848 until 1856. He married Anna Patterson and raised a family.

An ardent supporter of states rights, Ayer signed the ordinance of secession and represented South Carolina in the Confederate Congress from 1862 until the war's end in 1865. He died in 1895 in Anderson, South Carolina.

References

1821 births
1895 deaths
Members of the Confederate House of Representatives from South Carolina
19th-century American politicians
Harvard University alumni
University of Virginia alumni
University of South Carolina alumni
People from Barnwell, South Carolina